The Altdorf Forest is a forested, low mountain ridge between Aulendorf and Vogt in the county of Ravensburg in the German state of Baden-Württemberg.

The forest has an area of about 82 km² and is thus the largest contiguous forest in Upper Swabia. It is divided into state, municipal and private forests, of which the aristocratic House of Waldburg-Wolfegg owns the largest area.

References

Literature 
 Anton Huber: Beiträge zur Geschichte des Altdorfer Waldes. Staatliches Forstamt, Ravensburg, 1998
 Jochen Jauch: Geschichte und Geschichten aus dem Altdorfer Wald. Von der Försterei Gambach zum Forstrevier Bergatreute. Eppe, Bergatreute, 2012, 
 Volker Kracht (ed.): Die Naturschutzgebiete im Regierungsbezirk Tübingen. 2nd edition. Thorbecke, Ostfildern, 2006,  (includes coverage of the few nature reserves in the Altdorf Forest)
 J. D. G. von Memminger: Der Altdorfer Wald, in: Beschreibung des Oberamts Ravensburg. Cotta, Stuttgart and Tübingen, 1836 (e-text and digital version at Wikisource)
 Der Altdorfer Wald, in: Allgemeine Forst und Jagdzeitung, 9th annual issue, 1840, pp. 424ff. (digitalised)

External links 

 3202 Altdorfer Wald, landscape fact file by the BfN

Regions of Baden-Württemberg
Forests and woodlands of Baden-Württemberg
Ravensburg (district)
Upper Swabia